Edward Troye (12 July 1808 - 25 July 1874), was a Swiss-born American painter of Thoroughbred horses.

Early life and background
Troye was born on July 12, 1808 in Lausanne, Switzerland.

Travels
At age 20 he emigrated to the West Indies, and later on to Philadelphia, Pennsylvania where he was an employed artist of Sartain's Magazine.

Career as painter

Life in Kentucky
On July 16, 1839, Troye married Corneila Van de Graff of Scott County, Kentucky, and settled in Central Kentucky where he lived for the next 35 years.

While living in Kentucky, Troye painted portraits and race horses for the local families in Georgetown, Kentucky. He worked primarily for the Steele and Alexander families, and Alexander "Keene" Richards.

Troye taught French and drawing at Spring Hill College, 1849-1855.

Later travels and move to Alabama
Later he and Richards traveled to the Holy Land where he painted horses, Damascus, Syria cattle, the Dead Sea and the bazaar of Damascus while Richards bought Arabian horses. Bethany College, West Virginia retains copies of some of these paintings.

In 1869, Troye moved his family to a  cotton plantation in Madison County, Alabama. Troye returned to Kentucky and resided at the home of longtime friend Keen Richards until his death from pneumonia on July 25, 1874.

Death and legacy
Troye's best works, between the years 1835 and 1874 (prior to the birth of photography), are true-to-life delineations of historical American Great Plains horses. He painted  Southern United States pre-American Civil War thoroughbreds. Little was known of Troye's work in the eastern United States until 1912. Since then, more than 300 of his paintings have been found, of which three-fourths have been photographed since 1912. In addition, he is the author of The Race Horses of America (1867).

Troye is buried in Georgetown Cemetery with his wife and grandson, Clarence D. Johnson.

Notable horse paintings

American Eclipse and Sir Henry
Bertrand
Black Maria
Boston and his son, Lexington
Glencoe I
Kentucky
Lecomte
Leviathan
Longfellow
Ophelia - dam of Gray Eagle
Reality
Reel
Revenue
Richard Singleton
Ruthless
Wagner
West Australian

References

External links

1808 births
1874 deaths
Artists from Geneva
Artists from Philadelphia
People from Scott County, Kentucky
19th-century American painters
American male painters
19th-century Swiss painters
Swiss male painters
Painters from Kentucky
Spring Hill College alumni
Swiss emigrants to the United States
19th-century American male artists
19th-century Swiss male artists